The Ostrich Egg Globe is a hollow terrestrial globe made from the conjoined lower halves of two ostrich eggs. The owner of the globe claims that it was made in the early 16th century and is the first  globe to depict the New World (with North America only shown as small islands). The carvings on the globe are similar to those on the Hunt–Lenox Globe, a red copper cast.

Provenance 
The globe was offered for sale in 2012 at the London Map Fair held at the Royal Geographical Society. Its similarity to the Lenox Globe was confirmed by the former president of the Coronelli Society, Professor Rudolf Schmidt, and confirmed by art expert Archduke Dr. Géza von Habsburg in 2013.

The owner of the globe, Stefaan Missinne, has written a book that argues that the globe was made by Leonardo da Vinci, citing writings by Leonardo indicating a similar approach to making globe gores. Cartographer Wouter Bracke states that Missine's book should be considered "a report on the author's research into the globe and [not] a final scientific and academic publication", and that Cambridge Scholars Publishing's lack of editorial board "clearly failed to guide the author in the preparation of his publication". Ultimately, Bracke states that more research is needed to conclude the question of the globe's age and provenance.

See also 

 Behaim Globe

References 
Footnotes

Citations

Further reading
 L. Salvatelli, J. Constable, Riflessi (ed enigmi) in una sfera di vetro, in Medioevo, 279 (2020), pp. 12–16.
L. Salvatelli, J. Constable, Some Notes on Magnifying Globes and the Salvator Mundi

Globes
16th-century maps and globes
Works attributed to Leonardo da Vinci
1500s works
Ostriches
Eggs in culture